Church of Christ the Cornerstone is an Ecumenical church in Milton Keynes, Buckinghamshire. It was completed in 1991 and has the Church of England, the Baptist Union, the Methodist Church, the Roman Catholic Church and the United Reformed Church working together to share the space. It is situated in Central Milton Keynes on Saxon Gate, between Midsummer and Silbury boulevards, with the Fred Roche Memorial Gardens behind it. It was the first ecumenical metro centre church in the United Kingdom.

History

Foundation
In late September 1979, a Local Ecumenical Partnership was created. It commenced with a service of dedication in Middleton Hall in Central Milton Keynes Shopping Centre. On 6 April 1980, the present congregation met at a site called Centrecom on North Row. At Easter 1981, they moved next door to Milton Keynes Central Library.

Construction

On 31 May 1990, The Baron Campbell of Eskan, the first Chairperson of Milton Keynes Development Corporation, broke ground on the site. On 4 June 1990, construction work on the church. Iain Smith, of Planning Design Development in Milton Keynes, designed the church. The Church Square, around the site was built by Beazer Developments and the church building was constructed by Marriotts of Rushden.

On 20 December 1991, construction was completed at the church was handed over.  On 12 January 1992, the congregations moved into the new church. On 29 March 1991, the cross was placed on top of the church. It was designed by Alan Evans, an artist from Stroud in Gloucestershire.

To the top of the lantern, the church is 101 feet high and the cross adds another 18 feet to the height.

On 13 March 1992, the church was dedicated by Queen Elizabeth II in a service where the music was composed by Jonathan Dove.

Organ
The organ is by J. W. Walker & Sons Ltd. It was built in 1965 for the former Royal College of Organists in Kensington, which the College vacated in 1991, following which it was installed in the church.

Chapel
The chapel is open seven days a week from 8:00 am to 8:00 pm and the café is open from 8:30 am to 4:00 pm Monday to Friday. 
On the weekend, in the church, there are services on Saturday at 5.30 pm for the Catholic Vigil Mass and on Sunday at 10.00 am for the morning service and 6.00 pm for the evening service. During the week there is a Daily Prayer at 9.30am Monday to
Friday and Catholic Mass on Mondays at 12.30 pm.

See also
 Central Milton Keynes

References

External links

 Church of Christ the Cornerstone site

Churches in Milton Keynes
Catholic–Protestant ecumenism
Roman Catholic Diocese of Northampton
Diocese of Oxford
Methodism in England
United Reformed churches in England
Baptist Christianity in England